Małkowski is a Polish masculine surname. Its feminine counterpart is Małkowska. It may refer to:
Andrzej Małkowski (1888–1919), Polish scout
Ed Marlo (born Edward Malkowski, 1913–1991), American magician
Eugeniusz Geno Malkowski (1942–2016), Polish painter
Gary Malkowski (born 1958), Canadian provincial politician
Maciej Małkowski (born 1985), Polish association football player 
Olga Drahonowska-Małkowska (1888–1979), Polish scout, wife of Andrzej
Sebastian Małkowski (born 1987), Polish association football player 
Zbigniew Małkowski (born 1978), Polish association football player 

Polish-language surnames